The Thicket is a settlement located north of Bay Roberts, Newfoundland and Labrador. The population was 61 in 1951; 65 in 1956.

See also
List of communities in Newfoundland and Labrador

Populated coastal places in Canada
Populated places in Newfoundland and Labrador